Robert Rothbart (born Boris Kajmaković on June 16, 1986) is a Bosnian-Israeli professional basketball player playing the position of center for Elitzur Eito Ashkelon of the Israeli National League. He was named the Israeli Basketball Super League Most Improved Player in 2015.

Early life
Rothbart was born in Sarajevo, the capital of Bosnia and Herzegovina, which was at the time part of the former Yugoslavia. Due to the war, Robert and his family moved to Israel, where they stayed for two years before moving to the United States when he was eight years old.

After graduating from The Harker School, a private elementary school in San Jose, California, Rothbart played high school basketball for Saint Francis High School (Mountain View, California), Monta Vista High School (Cupertino, California), and Natomas High School (Sacramento, California). During his stay in Sacramento, he was involved in the Serbian community and was mentored by Serbian-born NBA star Vlade Divac. Rothbart pulled out of the 2004 NBA Draft before trying his luck a year later in the 2005 NBA Draft, but he went undrafted.

Professional career
Although he initially committed to Indiana University, Rothbart decided in the summer of 2004 to skip college and play in Europe, where he's active today.

After two seasons with Paris Basket Racing in the French Pro A league and one season with Israeli club Hapoel Galil Elyon, Rothbart moved back to play in his birth country of Bosnia and Herzegovina to play for Borac Banja Luka in the local First League of Republika Srpska.

Prior to the 2008–09 season, he returned to the Israeli League, this time signing with Ironi Nahariya.

Prior to the 2009–10 season, Rothbart signed with Elitzur Maccabi Netanya B.C., with whom he reached the Israeli Basketball State Cup semi-finals.

In the summer of 2010, Rothbart signed to play for Maccabi Haifa.

In August 2011, Rothbart signed with Union Olimpija.

Rothbart signed with Polish team Start Gdynia in 2012, Turkish team Gamateks Pamukkale Üniversitesi in 2013, and 2 Bosnian teams, Leotar and KK Igokea, in 2014.

In July 2015, Rothbart signed a 2-year deal with Hapoel Tel Aviv after being named the Israeli League's Most Improved Player and MVP of the league's all-star game in the previous season. He was named the Israeli Basketball Super League Most Improved Player in 2015.

In July 2016, Rothbart signed with Hapoel Eilat.

On August 17, 2017, Rothbart signed with Maccabi Kiryat Gat, joining his former head coach Roi Hagai. In 35 games played for Kiryat Gat, he averaged 18.9 points, 12.3 rebounds, 2.3 assists and 2.1 blocks per game. Rothbart helped Kiryat Gat reach the Liga Leumit Finals, where they eventually lost to Hapoel Be'er Sheva.

On June 4, 2018, Rothbart returned to France for a second stint, signing a one year deal with a second year option with ESSM Le Portel of the LNB Pro A league. However, on November 11, Rothbart parted ways with Le Portel to join Hapoel Be'er Sheva for the rest of the season.

On July 14, 2019, Rothbart signed a one-year deal with Elitzur Eito Ashkelon of the Israeli National League.

Personal
Robert holds citizenship for a few countries including Bosnia and Herzegovina, Serbia, the United States of America, and Israel.

References

External links
 NBA.com Draft Profile

1986 births
Living people
ABA League players
Bosnia and Herzegovina men's basketball players
Bosnia and Herzegovina emigrants to Israel
Bosnia and Herzegovina Jews
Centers (basketball)
Converts to Judaism from Eastern Orthodoxy
Elitzur Maccabi Netanya B.C. players
ESSM Le Portel players
Hapoel Be'er Sheva B.C. players
Hapoel Galil Elyon players
Ironi Nahariya players
Israeli men's basketball players
Israeli Basketball Premier League players
Israeli Jews
Israeli people of Serbian descent
Jewish men's basketball players
KK Igokea players
KK Leotar players
KK Olimpija players
OKK Borac players
Maccabi Haifa B.C. players
Maccabi Kiryat Gat B.C. players
Paris Racing Basket players
Serbian emigrants to Israel
Serbian Jews
Serbs of Bosnia and Herzegovina
Basketball players from Sarajevo
Yugoslav emigrants to Israel
The Harker School alumni